Near East B.C. in international competitions is the history and statistics of Near East B.C. in FIBA Europe and Euroleague Basketball Company competitions.

European competitions

See also
 Greek basketball clubs in international competitions

External links
FIBA Europe
EuroLeague
ULEB
EuroCup

Greek basketball clubs in European and worldwide competitions